The following tables are the detailed results of the Ontario electoral reform referendum that was held on October 10, 2007, in an attempt to establish a mixed member proportional representation (MMP) system for elections to the Legislative Assembly of Ontario. However, the vote went heavily in favor of the existing plurality voting or "first-past-the-post" (FPTP) system.

Results for Ontario regions excluding Toronto

Results for Toronto regions

Province-wide results summary 

2007 referendums
2007 Ontario electoral reform referendum detailed results
2007 elections in Canada
Referendums in Ontario
Electoral reform details